Steven Francis "Steve" McLaughlin (born October 4, 1963) is an American politician serving as County Executive of Rensselaer County, New York. A Republican, McLaughlin represented the 107th District in the New York State Assembly from 2011 to 2017; the district included parts of Albany, Columbia, Greene and Rensselaer Counties in New York's Capital Region. McLaughlin was elected Rensselaer County Executive in November 2017. In 2021 he was indicted on charges of Grand Larceny in the Third Degree and Offering a False Instrument for Filing in the First Degree, both felonies. He has been recognized for three consecutive county budgets that lowered property taxes, significant private-sector job creation, an effective response to the COVID-19 pandemic and a refusal to follow an order by Governor Cuomo to force COVID-19 positive patients into nursing homes.

Early life and education
McLaughlin was born in Boston, Massachusetts, the third of four children of Arthur and Winifred McLaughlin. He was raised in Wrentham, Massachusetts, attending public elementary school and Xaverian Brothers High School.

He attended the Florida Institute of Technology in 1983 and received commercial and instrument aircraft ratings. He then studied finance at Arizona State University. He earned a B.A. degree from Empire State College (State University of New York) and an M.B.A. from the University of Phoenix.

Career
Before entering politics, McLaughlin was an airline pilot and a banker.

McLaughlin was elected to the New York State Assembly on November 2, 2010, when he defeated incumbent Timothy P. Gordon. McLaughlin had previously run against Gordon in 2008, but was defeated. McLaughlin was re-elected to the Assembly in 2012, 2014, and 2016.

McLaughlin was censured by the New York State Assembly Ethic Committee for violations of the Sexual Harassment Policy after he requested a female staff member send him nude photos.

McLaughlin developed a reputation as an anti-establishment voice and an outspoken critic of New York Gov. Andrew Cuomo. In 2013, McLaughlin criticized Cuomo's gun control policies and compared him to Adolf Hitler, Mussolini, and Putin. McLaughlin later apologized for making the comparison.

McLaughlin ran for Rensselaer County Executive in 2017 following the retirement of longtime County Executive Kathy Jimino. After defeating Deputy County Executive Christopher Meyer in a contentious Republican primary, McLaughlin narrowly prevailed over Democrat Andrea Smyth in the general election.

Mclaughlin was sworn in as Rensselaer County executive on January 1, 2018.

On December 1, 2021, McLaughlin was indicted on two felony counts, including grand larceny in the third degree for misusing campaign funds to pay personal debts

Accomplishments as County Executive
During his first State of the County address in 2018, McLaughlin referenced his campaign, telling county lawmakers: "I fought hard to get here, and I will fight even harder for you as your County Executive." McLaughlin set to work implementing a number of efficiencies in county government, reforming purchasing and personnel moves, generating a savings.

Property taxes
For the 2019 budget, McLaughlin's first as Executive, county property taxes were lowered by a slight margin, less than one-percent. McLaughlin's next two budgets for 2020 and 2021 also lowered county property taxes. The county has also generated a significant savings during each year of McLaughlin's service as Executive.

County roads
Improvement and repair of county roads has been a major focus during McLaughlin's first term. With over 320 miles in the county road network, the county typically paved on average about 20 miles annually before McLaughlin took office. Entering 2021, McLaughlin had paved 105 miles of county roads, after setting a record by paving 50 miles of roads in 2020. For 2021, McLaughlin announced the "Drive for 65", a plan to pave 65 miles in one year and break the record set in 2020. If accomplished, the Drive for 65 would mean over half the county road network had been paved in four years. The road paving effort has drawn support from legislators and residents.

COVID-19 response
Rensselaer County saw the first case of COVID-19 in March 2020. McLaughlin issued a State of Emergency similar to declarations issued by counties across the state. On March 25 of that year, Governor Andrew Cuomo's administration issued an Executive Order to force COVID-19 positive patients into nursing homes, including the county's Van Rensselaer Manor nursing home. McLaughlin was the only County Executive to refuse the order, stating "Not here, not now, not ever". The state had also issued a directive requiring any person entering a nursing home to show proof of a negative test. Despite the rule, state and federal inspectors attempted on multiple occasions to enter the county nursing home while refusing to show proof of a negative test. McLaughlin met the inspectors on two occasions and blocked them from entering. McLaughlin told WNYT: "I don't care if you're Donald Trump. I don't care if you're Andrew Cuomo. You're not coming through the door without proof of a negative test." The nursing home has faced numerous fines and citations ranging from abuse to failure to prevent infection during McLaughlin's tenure.

Despite numerous requests from McLaughlin, the state did not set up a COVID-19 testing site in the county, forcing residents to travel distances for testing. McLaughlin received support from every mayor, supervisor and legislator in the county to establish an independent testing operation. The county test site represented the largest investment by a county in upstate in a testing operation.
As vaccines became available, McLaughlin again worked to establish an independent county vaccination site, utilizing an athletic complex at Hudson Valley Community College, which is sponsored by the county. The county provided the first vaccine to the public at the HVCC site in January 2021. The public has praised the county vaccine operation for efficiency. To encourage vaccines during the summer months, McLaughlin devised an initiative for a mobile vaccination unit, teaming up with the Capital District Transportation Authority for the Vax Bus.     The Vax Bus has been utilized at summer concerts, community events and games by the professional team, the Tri-City ValleyCats. As Rensselaer County enters the summer, COVID-19 cases have been declining, with nine days during June with no new cases. Despite the increase of COVID-19 infections and deaths in Rensselaer County. McLaughlin immediately removed the utilization of the Vaxbus upon him winning reelection as County Executive. Additionally, Many speculated McLaughlin utilized the vaxbus as a source of campaign fraud when he had his likeness posted on the bus during 2021 reelection drive. Despite the increase of COVID-19 infections and deaths in Rensselaer County between July 2021 (54) through January 2022 (223). McLaughlin immediately removed the utilization of the Vaxbus upon him winning reelection as County Executive. The Vaxbus was paid for by tax payers.  During the COVID-19 pandemic. McLaughlin was an active antimask proponent. Stating "Masks are only a form of government Control"

During the pandemic, which was also the pre-election campaign year. McLaughlin won many votes when the republican Majority established a First Responder fund from tax revenue. Each Volunteer Fire Department in the county received a $10,000.00 award, personally issued by McLaughlin, while Staff at the County operated Van Rensselaer Manor Nursing Facility were denied pay raised for having to work using both overtime and reuse their own masks or reuse an N95 mask provided to them, without proper decontamination for as long as Eight (8) months. McLaughlin stated, "The staff at Van Rensselaer Manor are under Union Contract and it would be too difficult to provide them with any additional salary increases at this time."  McLaughlin later awarded the paid/Unionized Fire Departments in the city's of Rensselaer and Troy with the same $10,000.00 awards given to the volunteer fire Departments in the county. It was believed, by many, McLaughlin did so to buy votes with tax dollars to win his reelection.

Improvement of county services
When seeking office in 2017, McLaughlin promised to construct a new emergency services training tower after the former one had been closed for several years. The former training structure was levelled during the pandemic. Final approvals were received from the state and construction expected to begin in summer 2021.
The county earned recognition by coming under budget by $18 million during the pandemic. McLaughlin announced plans to utilize some of the savings to aid fire, ambulance and community organizations. The Rensselaer County Responds plan was approved in spring 2021 by the County Legislature, with funds set to be distributed the same year. Along with Rensselaer County Responds, the county is investing in new highway equipment.

Open government
Prior to McLaughlin's service, the county was without social media outreach. On taking office, McLaughlin implemented social media pages for county government, allowing for easier and more timely updates for residents. He has made extensive utilization of the county government social media pages for self-promotion. During the early days of the COVID-19 pandemic, McLaughlin also provided regular livestream updates, and was the only County Executive to take live questions from residents.

However, in January 2022, McLaughlin directed the removal of all comment sections on all county operated and taxpayer funded wed apps such as Facebook and Twitter. Including the County COVID-19 dashboard which stated "Rensselaer County Cares".

It has been suspected, McLaughlin directed the removal of all comment sections to purge the system and allow the county to delete any potentially incriminating evidence.

Personal life
McLaughlin resides in North Greenbush. He has two sons, Danny and Sean.
Mclaughin is divorced from his estranged wife after accusation of repeated infidelity during the marriage.

References

External links
New York State Assembly website

1963 births
21st-century American politicians
Arizona State University alumni
Empire State College alumni
Florida Institute of Technology alumni
Living people
Republican Party members of the New York State Assembly
People from Schaghticoke, New York
Politicians from Boston
University of Phoenix alumni
W. P. Carey School of Business alumni
Xaverian Brothers High School alumni
Commercial aviators